National Road 42 is a highway in northwestern Aetolia-Acarnania and in Lefkada, Greece. It links the town of Lefkada with the Greek National Road 5 (Antirrio - Arta - Ioannina) in Amfilochia, passing through the town of Vonitsa.

The eastern part of the GR-42, between Amfilochia and Vonitsa, runs along the southern shore of the Ambracian Gulf. The highway contains a bridge over the Vonitsa Lagoon. A drawbridge form the connection of the island of Lefkada to the mainland. The road ends in the town of Lefkada.

Places
The GR-42 passes through the following towns (ordered from west to east):

Lefkada (city)
Agios Nikolaos
Vonitsa
Paliampelia
Sparto
Amfilochia

References 

42
Roads in the Ionian Islands (region)
Roads in Western Greece